The 1980 Fort Lauderdale Strikers season was the fourth season of the Fort Lauderdale Striker's team, and the club's fourteenth season in professional soccer.  This year the team made it to the finals of North American Soccer League by reaching the Soccer Bowl.  They were this year's Runners-up.

Background

Review

Competitions

Friendlies 
Fort Lauderdale finished their preseason exhibition schedule with one victory over an NCAA Division II squad, and two draws versus Peruvian First Division teams, three losses against NASL clubs and one loss to an NCAA Division II team. In April after the NASL season had begun, the Strikers easily handled the Miami Hurricanes and the junior side, Calry Bohemian FC, of Sligo, Ireland. They later fell to visiting Sunderland A.F.C. in a midseason friendly in May.

Results summaries

NASL regular season

Results summaries

Results by round

Match reports

NASL Playoffs 

Playoffs
In 1979 and 1980, if a playoff series was tied at one victory each, a full 30 minute mini-game was played. If neither team held an advantage after the 30 minutes, the teams would then move on to a shoot-out to determine a series winner.

First round

Conference semifinals

Conference Championship

Soccer Bowl '80

Bracket

Match reports

Statistics

Transfers

References 

1980
Fort Lauderdale Strikers
Fort Lauderdale Strikers
Fort Lauderdale